Rembrandt fecit 1669  is a 1977 Dutch film directed by Jos Stelling.

Cast
Frans Stelling - The young Rembrandt
Ton de Koff - The old Rembrandt
Lucie Singeling - Saskia van Uylenburg
Aya Gill - Hendrikje Stoffels
Hanneke van der Velden - Geertje Dircx
Ed Kolmeijer - Titus
Henk Douze

External links 
 

Dutch drama films
1977 films
1970s Dutch-language films
Films directed by Jos Stelling
Films set in the 1660s
Films about Rembrandt